A manifesto is a published declaration of the intentions, motives, or views of the issuer, be it an individual, group, political party or government. A manifesto usually accepts a previously published opinion or public consensus or promotes a new idea with prescriptive notions for carrying out changes the author believes should be made. It often is political, social or artistic in nature, sometimes revolutionary, but may present an individual's life stance. Manifestos relating to religious belief are generally referred to as creeds or, a confession of faith.

Etymology 

It is derived from the Italian word , itself derived from the Latin , meaning clear or conspicuous. Its first recorded use in English is from 1620, in Nathaniel Brent's translation of Paolo Sarpi's History of the Council of Trent: "To this citation he made answer by a Manifesto" (p. 102). Similarly, "They were so farre surprised with his Manifesto, that they would never suffer it to be published" (p. 103).

See also 
 Art manifesto
 Election promise
 Government platform
 Party line (politics)
 Party platform

References

External links 
 Manifestos.net
 
 British political party manifesto archives, 1900–present: Labour, Conservative, Liberal/SDP/Liberal Democrat

Academic works about politics
Election campaigning